Liu Yi-ling is a Taiwanese taekwondo practitioner. She won a silver medal in heavyweight at the 1987 World Taekwondo Championships. She won a silver medal at the 1986 Asian Taekwondo Championships in Darwin, and a gold medal at the 1990 Asian Championships.

References

External links

Year of birth missing (living people)
Living people
Taiwanese female taekwondo practitioners
Asian Taekwondo Championships medalists
World Taekwondo Championships medalists
20th-century Taiwanese women